Shawn Reaves (born February 5, 1978) is an American actor. He is best known for the role of Harrison Davies, the brother of the main character Tru Davies (played by Eliza Dushku) on the Fox television series, Tru Calling.

Reaves was born in Monroe, Louisiana.  He studied acting in New York City at the Lee Strasberg Theater Institute and was coached privately by Harold Guskin. He is currently living in Los Angeles.

Filmography

Film
 Things Behind the Sun (2001) as Tex
 Auto Focus (2002) as Bob Crane Jr. at 20
 Dandelion (2004) as Arlee
 8 Ball (2008) as Vincent
 Shadowheart (2009) as Johny Cooper

Television
 Tru Calling (2003–05) as Harrison Davies
 Law & Order: Special Victims Unit (2006) as Daniel Hunter
 CSI: Miami (2007) as Louis Sullivan
 Life (2007) as Eddie
 Sanctuary (2009)
 Almost Human (2013)

Studies
He studied acting in New York at the Lee Strasberg Theatre Institute and worked one on one with Harold Guskin.  He has also studied with Lesley Kahn in Los Angeles and is a graduate of The Actors Circle, formerly Center Stage LA.

References

External links

1978 births
Living people
American male film actors
American male television actors